Giles Boothroyd (17 March 1969) is an English former professional rugby league footballer who played in the 1980s and 1990s.

Background
Boothroyd's birth was registered in Pontefract district, West Riding of Yorkshire, England.

Playing career

County Cup Final appearances
Boothroyd did not play in Castleford's 12-12 draw against Bradford Northern in the 1987 Yorkshire County Cup Final during the 1987–88 season at Headingley Rugby Stadium, Leeds, on Saturday 17 October 1987, played as an interchange/substitute, i.e. number 14, (replacing  Keith England) in the 2-11 defeat by Bradford Northern in the 1987 Yorkshire County Cup Final replay during the 1987–88 season at Elland Road, Leeds, on Saturday 31 October 1987, and played left-, i.e. number 4, and scored a try in the 12-33 defeat by Leeds in the 1988 Yorkshire County Cup Final during the 1988–89 season at Elland Road on Sunday 16 October 1988.

Club career
Boothroyd was signed from Lock Lane ARLFC by Castleford on 8 April 1987, and made his début for them in the 20-10 victory over St. Helens on Sunday 30 August 1987.

References

External links

1969 births
Living people
Castleford Tigers players
English rugby league players
Hunslet R.L.F.C. players
Rugby league centres
Rugby league players from Pontefract